On July 22, 2006, Minneapolis Police Department officer Jason Andersen shot Fong Fee—a 19-year-old Hmong American man—eight times while pursing him for arrest, killing him at the scene. The police pursuit and shooting occurred near Cityview school in the McKinley neighborhood of Minneapolis. In the shooting aftermath, Andersen was legally cleared of wrongdoing by an internal police department investigation and in state and federal legal cases. The United States Supreme Court in 2010 declined to take up an appeal of the federal case brought forward by Lee's family. 

The manner of Lee's death and the legal case against Andersen generated public outcry, particularly among the Hmong American community in Minneapolis–Saint Paul. Concerns persisted about Andersen's use of deadly force and about the investigation of the incident, such as if there was potential evidence tampering. Public outcry over Lee's death was renewed during protests of racial injustice following the police murder of George Floyd in 2020.

Shooting

People involved 
Jason Andersen was a 32-year-old officer with the Minneapolis Police Department. He was a member of the Metro Gang Strike Force.

Fong Lee was a 19-year-old Hmong American man. He was born in a refugee camp in Thailand and his family was resettled in the United States.

Incident 
On July 22, 2006, just before 7:00 p.m. CDT, Fong Lee was riding his bicycle with four friends near Cityview school in north Minneapolis. A Minneapolis Police Department squad car containing Andersen and his partner rode alongside Lee as they were followed by a Minnesota State Patrol vehicle. Andersen claimed after the shooting that he observed another person on a bicycle hand a gun to Lee and the squad car began to pursue Lee, who dropped his bicycle and ran. Andersen and a state trooper pursued Lee with their guns drawn on foot in an attempt to apprehend him. Andersen claimed Lee was armed and had turned toward him possibly to shoot, and fired his gun. Andersen's initial shot missed. Andersen continued to pursue Lee, and struck him three times as he turned around again. Lee fell to the ground, and Andersen claimed Lee raised his arm holding a gun, and he fired again five additional times. Lee was struck by a total of eight rounds of gunfire fired by Andersen and died at the scene.

Investigation 

Part of the incident was captured by security camera footage at the school, but not the actual shooting. The blurry footage captured Lee running away from Andersen, but it was unclear from the footage of if Lee was carrying a gun in his hand as he ran. A .380-caliber semi-automatic handgun was found next to Lee's body. The gun lacked any fingerprints or smudges.

Family members of Lee disputed the police account and said the Lee was unarmed and questioned if the gun had been planted. On March 30, 2009, police documents suggested the gun had been held in police possession since 2004, when police recovered the weapon after it was reported stolen. Lee family attorney Mike Padden stated that the first police officer to arrive after the shooting was Minneapolis police officer Bruce Johnson, who two years before had written up the burglary report on this same gun. Minneapolis Police Chief Tim Dolan denied the accusation, and said that the gun recovered next to Lee's body had never been in held police custody.

Andersen was placed on administrative leave by the police department, but was reinstated two days after the shooting. Minneapolis homicide detectives and an internal police investigation later determined Andersen had acted in accordance with its guidelines.

Legal proceedings
A grand jury decided not to indict Andersen in a decision given on July 28, 2007, on criminal charges under Minnesota Statutes. Hmong community activists filed a complaint with the Minnesota Department of Civil Rights, but the case was not investigated and the matter was closed without further action.

Lee's family sought judicial action in federal court. The federal case, which was presided over by Judge Paul A. Magnuson, considered if Andersen's use of force was excessive and if his actions were malicious and should therefore result in compensatory damages. The police said at trial that the stolen gun recovered in 2004 was not the same gun in Lee's possession the day of the July 22, 2006, shooting as there had been a mix-up in the identification and paperwork, and that Lee's gun had not been in police custody prior to Andersen fatally shooting Lee. On May 27, 2009, a federal jury, which did not have any racial minority representation, decided against the family of Lee and ruled that Andersen's use of force was lawful. 

The family of Lee appealed the federal case to the 8th Circuit Court of Appeals, which upheld the jury's verdict in a ruling in August 2010. The Supreme Court of the United States declined to hear the case in December 2010, which let the lower court ruling stand.

Aftermath

Jason Andersen 
Andersen received a Medal of Valor, the police department's second-highest honor, in 2008. In July 2009, Andersen was placed on administrative leave by the police department after allegations of domestic violence. He was fired by the department in September 2009 after an internal investigation. In 2010, Andersen was charged, but acquitted at trial, of a federal civil rights charge for allegedly kicking a Black teenager in the head during a 2006 arrest incident. By 2020, Andersen was employed by Minneapolis Police Department as a chaplain coordinator.

Protests 

The shooting created tension between the Hmong American community in Minneapolis and the police department with concerns of racial bias in policing. A 150-person protest over Lee's death was held at Minneapolis City Hall on July 26, 2006. Community activists called for an independent investigation at a rally on March 30, 2009. A protest over Lee's death was held in north Minneapolis on October 2, 2010.

Controversy about Lee's death was renewed during protests over the police murder of George Floyd in 2020. Lee's family and Hmong American activists joined Black Lives Matter protesting police brutality during the 2020–2023 Minneapolis–Saint Paul racial unrest. In 2021, demonstrators placed a memorial for Lee at the George Floyd Square occupied protest.

See also
 History of the Hmong in Minneapolis–Saint Paul
 List of killings by law enforcement officers in Minnesota

References

People shot dead by law enforcement officers in the United States
2006 deaths
Deaths by person in Minnesota
Deaths by firearm in Minnesota
Minneapolis Police Department
Asian-American-related controversies
American people of Hmong descent